"A Line in the Dirt" is a 2010 single by Eels from the album End Times. The cover to the single and the album were illustrated by Adrian Tomine. The single was originally released through Eels' online store on January 13, 2010, and was released for general distribution on March 1, 2010.

Track listing
All songs written by E.
"A Line in the Dirt" – 3:30
"Little Bird" – 2:34

Sales chart performance
The song reached 32 on the Belgium Singles Chart (Flanders).

References

2010 singles
Eels (band) songs
Songs written by Mark Oliver Everett
Song recordings produced by Mark Oliver Everett
2010 songs